High Off Life is the eighth studio album by  American rapper Future, released on May 15, 2020, by Freebandz and Epic Records. The album was executive produced by close friend and frequent collaborator DJ Esco. It features guest appearances by Travis Scott, YoungBoy Never Broke Again, Young Thug, Lil Uzi Vert, Drake, Lil Durk, Meek Mill, Doe Boy, DaBaby, and Lil Baby.

High Off Life received generally favorable reviews from critics and debuted atop the US Billboard 200. It is Future's seventh album to top the chart. The album was supported by five singles: "100 Shooters", "Last Name", "Life Is Good", "Tycoon", and "Trillionaire", with "Life Is Good" peaking at number two on the US Billboard Hot 100.

Background
During an interview with XXL, published on April 7, 2020, Future shared the album's title Life Is Good, titled after the third single. Alongside the announcement, he described the album by stating; 

On May 12, 2020, the album was retitled to High Off Life, as the previous title, Life Is Good, was considered to not play well during the COVID-19 pandemic. American basketball player Lonzo Ball, a known fan of Future, posted an Instagram story of the album's tracklist, whereafter Epic Records officially announced the album's release on May 15, 2020.

Promotion

Singles
The album's first single, "100 Shooters" featuring American rappers Meek Mill and Doe Boy, was released on July 12, 2019. The music video for the song was released on August 22, 2019.

The album's second single, "Last Name" featuring American rapper Lil Durk, was released on November 15, 2019. The music video for the song was released on November 20.

The album's third single, "Life Is Good" featuring Canadian rapper Drake, was released on January 10, 2020, as well an accompanying music video. The song peaked at number two on the US Billboard Hot 100.

The music video for the song, "Tycoon", was released on March 27, 2020. It was released for digital download on April 1, 2020, as the album's fourth single. The song peaked at number 76 on the Billboard Hot 100.

"Trillionaire" featuring American rapper YoungBoy Never Broke Again, was sent to rhythmic contemporary radio on May 26, 2020, as the album's fifth single. The song peaked at number 34 on the Billboard Hot 100.

Promotional singles
The remix of "Life Is Good" featuring Drake and American rappers DaBaby and Lil Baby, was released on February 15, 2020, as the album's first promotional single.

Critical reception

High Off Life was met with generally favorable reviews. At Metacritic, which assigns a normalized rating out of 100 to reviews from professional publications, the album received an average score of 70, based on nine reviews. Aggregator AnyDecentMusic? gave it 6.3 out of 10, based on their assessment of the critical consensus.

In a positive review, Dana Scott of HipHopDX wrote that "There are 21 tracks on jammed with booming, mellow Atlanta trap flare and some inconsistency between bangers and filler tracks with similar minimalist, psychedelic soundscapes". Jayasuriya Mehan from Pitchfork enjoyed the album, saying, "Except for the previously released singles that pad the end of the record in keeping with industry norms, High Off Life is better-paced and sequenced than most of Future's recent releases—the whole thing seems to glide by frictionlessly". Rob Sheffield of Rolling Stone gave the album a positive review, stating that "High Off Life is Future at his most optimistic, as the man from Pluto decides to send out a positive message. But it's still got the spaced-out melancholy that always fills his sound, as he clocks some serious demon hours in the late-night druggy strip-club haze of his soul". Addison Herron-Wheeler of Exclaim! said, "Pretty much the only complaint is that, similar to all of his releases since the infamous Evol, it delivers and lives up to the hype, but it doesn't build and surpass his previous work. It remains to be seen whether he will ever create an album that is better than everything he's done so far, but this is still an extremely solid release". Entertainment Weekly critic Gary Suarez said, "While the commercial prospects for High Off Life remain high, Future seems, at least creatively, in a state of arrested development here. ... Still, when High Off Life succeeds, it does so extraordinarily".

NMEs Luke Morgan Britton wrote in a lukewarm review of High Off Life that "[the] trap outlier exerts flashes of greatness... but doesn't quite fulfil his sales pitch", adding: "Future described his last album, 2019's The Wizrd, as the closing of a chapter, meaning that High Off Life seemed primed to signal a fresh start. Despite its glimpses of greatness, though, this album revisits too many of the rapper's trademark themes to truly make good on his jubilant pre-release promises." In a mixed review, Beats Per Minutes Chase McMullen stated: "For the man who elevated devastated depravity into his own art form, it can't help but feel a bit disappointing to watch him continue to coast."

Industry awards

Commercial performance
High Off Life was certified gold by the Recording Industry Association of America (RIAA) 30 minutes after its release due to a technicality that incorporates the track-equivalent units moved by previously released singles "Life Is Good" and "Tycoon".

The album debuted at number one on the US Billboard 200 chart, with 153,000 album-equivalent units (including 16,000 pure album sales) in its first week. This became Future's seventh album to debut at number one. The album also accumulated a total of 186.3 million on-demand streams of the set's 21 tracks in the week ending May 21. In its second week, the album dropped to number three on the chart, earning an additional 61,000 units. In its third week, the album dropped to number five on the chart, earning 40,000 more units. In its fourth week, the album climbed to number four on the chart, earning 39,000 units, bringing its four week total to 293,000 album-equivalent units. On July 27, 2022, the album was certified double platinum for combined sales and album-equivalent units of over two million units in the United States.

In the United Kingdom, High Off Life debuted at number five on the UK Albums Chart, moving 4,000 units. It is Future's highest charting album to date in the United Kingdom.

Track listing

Notes
  signifies an uncredited co-producer

Personnel
Credits adapted from the album's liner notes.

 Bryan Anzel – recording (tracks 1, 6–9, 12–14, 20, 21), mixing (track 21)
 Eric Manco – recording (tracks 3, 5, 8–11, 16–20), engineering (tracks 1, 4, 6, 7, 9, 13, 14)
 Mike Dean – recording (track 4)
 Fxxxy – recording (track 4)
 Seth Firkins – recording (track 5)
 Noel Cadastre – recording (track 17), mixing (track 17)
 Anthony Cruz – recording (track 20)
 Tyler Unland – engineering assistant (track 20)
 Manny Marroquin – mixing (tracks 1, 3, 4, 6, 13, 14 ,19)
 Seal Solymar – mixing (track 4)
 Fabian Marasciullo – mixing (track 20)
 Colin Leonard – mastering (tracks 1–16, 19, 20)
 Chris Athens – mastering (tracks 17, 21)
 Glenn Schick – mastering (track 18)

Charts

Weekly charts

Year-end charts

Certifications

Release history

See also
List of Billboard 200 number-one albums of 2020
List of Billboard number-one R&B/hip-hop albums of 2020
List of number-one albums of 2020 (Canada)

References

External links

2020 albums
Future (rapper) albums
Epic Records albums
Albums produced by TM88
Albums produced by Cubeatz
Albums produced by Tay Keith
Albums produced by Wheezy
Albums produced by Southside (record producer)